Madonna fandom refers to the fan community of American singer-songwriter Madonna. She attained cult status amongst different audiences according to professor Sheila Jeffreys. Unlike other fandoms, her fan base does not have an official moniker, although "Madonna wannabe" became a popular media label to talk about her fans. The fanaticism surrounding the singer, and also called Madonnamania initiated no later than 1985. She produced various consecutive successful singles in various major music markets, established numerous international records and impacted the fashion industry. Millions of her female fans were dressing like Madonna around the world and the term "Madonna wannabe" was born.

Over the course of several decades, her fandom attracted various scholarly analysis, with her wannabes being the most studied audience at some point, flourished during the emerging of the fan studies. Her interaction with the audience has been also commented on, also as part of audience studies or media coverage. Author and scholar Lisa Lewis believes she is "one of the first women to attract the kind of devotion of young female fans normally associated with male rock stars". 

Before and after the solidification of Internet and social media, related-fan Madonna demonstrations, as well her fan clubs, fanzines, fansites, conventions and other fanatics demonstrations received significant media citations. A subject of diverse collections, Madonna topped the list "100 Most Collectable Divas" made by Record Collector in 2008. Her fandom set the world record of the biggest fan letter ever written. Mainly before the massive use of Internet, various of her fans achieved fame for being "Madonna fans". On point with this, John Hand from BBC commented in 2001, "it's becoming increasingly common for Madonna fans to achieve mini-celebrity status themselves". Madonna has also had a long list of obsessed fans and stalkers, many of whom she had personal encounters with and other of whom expressed a desire to kill her. American cult leader, David Koresh is an example of this latter group. Some celebrities and other personalities, who identified publicly as her fans, were influenced by that feeling in their work, including Mexican painter Alberto Gironella, whose latest works were dedicated to or inspired by the singer.

Madonnamania

Origins

The Madonnamania (also typeset as Madonna mania or Madonna-mania) was documented in numerous part of the world. Lucy O'Brien set its origin by 1985, describing in Madonna: Like an Icon that the fanaticism around Madonna "spread from city to city" in the U.S. Internationally, Teenager publication stated in 1985 "Now Madonnamania has swept countries all over the world". In Europe, Music & Media informed in September 1985, that the Madonnamania was spreading all over the continent. That year Argentine magazine Pelo, commented the Madonnmania "exceeds the limits of what is humanly bearable". Andrew Morton stated that around these years, the singer "reached a natural constituency with her fan base among young women, gays and blacks". Conversely El Siglo de Torreón held in 1993 that the Madonnamania started in 1983.

Her first international tour, Who's That Girl World Tour continued the frenzy surrounding Madonna. Italian writer Francesco Falconi felt that with this tour, Madonna had a very precise goal: "To spread Madonnamania all over the Planet". In 1987, Russell Baker observed the case of United Kingdom where media reports from London documented that the arrival of Madonna and its Madonnamania, "agitated" her young fans so "severely that they hurled themselves against the sheltering cops". At this point, Nick Robertshaw from Billboard commented that the arrival of Madonna at London's Heathrow Airport" was a "fan hysteria on a scale rarely seen since the days of the Osmonds". It was also reported that UK police officials were criticized for giving her treatment usually accorded royalty, stopping traffic for the passage of her limousine. Similarly, The Sydney Morning Herald informed that in her performance debut in Japan as part of the Who's That Girl World Tour, the singer "set off a wave of hysteria among hundreds of thousands of fans".

Madonna quickly achieved breaking-sales and consecutive successful singles in countries such as United Kingdom, Canada and the United States. She also impacted the fashion industry, as millions of her fans around the world were dressing like her and the term "Madonna wannabe" came out. In the following decades, she continued to breaking these kind of records and also sold-out numerous concerts.

Subsequent years

In the next following decades, the Madonnamania was also reported and revived in many parts of the world. Stephen Brown of Ulster University, felt that although Madonnamania "has slackened somewhat since the heady days of 1984, her staying power is as remarkable as her dramatic ascent". El Mercurio editor Sofía Maluenda in a 2018 article, argues that the Madonnamania "continues to be almost a religion".

After its first wave, in the 1980s, the most-well documented feeling of Madonnamania was perhaps when she lived in the United Kingdom with her then husband Guy Ritchie. It received press coverage by journalists like John Cassidy in 2000. According to American journalist Michael Musto: "the British are delighted that Madonna lives in London, where she is perceived as the new 'Princess Diana'". Cassidy also mentioned by some British, Madonna replaced Diana as "Fleet Street's favorite mother". J. Randy Taraborrelli also explored UK's particular affection for Madonna. In 2005, British channel ITV Granada created the TV special Madonna-mania.

During her concert tours, the Madonnamania usually resurrect either because she visited for the first time a country or city, or because she hadn't been there for a long-time. With regard to the latter, when she toured with the Sticky & Sweet Tour after 17 years of absence in South America, promoter Arthur Fogel said that the continent was "over-the-top amazing for Madonna", so "it was Madonna-mania" ended. A similar situation occurred in 2012 with the MDNA Tour in Mexico. Also, for her debut performance in Russia (2006) or Colombia (2012).

Groups and nicknames

While "Madonna wannabe" became a popular media label to talk about her fans, there is no a universal agreement or an official name for her fan community. Pier Dominguez from BuzzFeed News suggested that her online fandom called themselves "Iconers" (derived from the Madonna official fan club: Icon). Others media outlets have called her fans as "Madders". However, Jason Richards from The Atlantic said that themselves just call in plain old "fans". In Madonnaland (2016), author Alina Simone wrote that her fans "aren't necessarily cuddly" and don't have a "cute name".

"Madonna wannabe" has been a nickname associated with her fandom, or part of her audience over years. According to Annalee Newitz in 1993, her "youth audience" was called during the 1980s, Madonna wannabes. In 2019, Stars Insider commented "this label isn't for her fan base as a whole, but rather for those fans that love her so much they try to be her". One of her most important fan bases is the gay community, which audience has also embraced her as a gay icon. In an interview with Ellen DeGeneres in 2010, she told: "I wouldn't have a career if it weren't for the gay community". She also has had an important intellectual audience and academic fan base.

Levels and audience studies

Madonna and her fans were largely studied from perspectives of audience studies. Some have point out how Madonna appealed to a multiple fan base. French academic Georges-Claude Guilbert described as "an essential aspect" of her career what he calls "the uncommon composition of her public". At the beginning of her career, it mostly constituted teenage girls, then it gradually spread to a mass public says. Professor Sheila Jeffreys, concluded that she gained cult status amongst different audiences.

As Madonna fandom encompasses different groupings and levels, music critic Joey Guerra from Houston Chronicle "identified five most common types" of Madonna "maniacs", including what he calls "The Madonna Complex" which he said is a group of thinkers who are not necessarily interested in her music but appreciate Madonna's impact on society, sexuality and culture, devoting dissertation essays and classroom lectures.

Associate professor Tracy L. Tuten of Longwood University has concurred saying that "we can think of groups of Madonna fans", concluding that "each cultural grouping might emphasize different elements of the commercial production of the entity known as Madonna". She further adds that on a wider level, "they all had a connection to Madonna, they would all be united in the Madonna fan culture on that similar level, and probably other ones as well". Authors of The Italian 100: A Ranking of the Most Influential Cultural, Scientific, and Political Figures, Past and Present (1998) reported that "some fans become so obsessive about Madonna that they will endure hours in the rain or the cold just to get a glimpse of her".

Multimedia

Numerous Madonna-related fandom demonstrations were cited and covered by media. Before and after the massification of Internet.     

When the format was popular, the first and only authorized fanzine by Madonna was Like a Fanzine (later called Icon after its third edition), founded in 1990. According to some media, one of the earliest and best-covered fanzine was MLC (from her name Madonna Louise Ciccone), founded in 1987. Another fanzines, include Dare Star (previously called Madonna Magazine) edited both in France and Spain, while Variety talked about Justify My Life in 1993.

Podcasts such as MLVC: The Madonna Podcast have received citations by publications as well. Broadcast on iHeartRadio and Apple Podcasts, they achieved a nomination at the Queerties Awards 2023. Another podcast, Inside The Groove – Madonna's Music, is believed to be the world's most listened to Madonna podcast according to PinkNews in 2023, with Elle magazine reporting 50,000 downloads by 2020. Her figure has seen fan fictions as well through Internet.

Visual media and other works

Material Pipol a 2009 documentary made by official Chilean club, MadonnaChile was well-received and gained attention of national media, including a cover in La Cuarta. Russian Oxana Nabokova presented in 2019 the documentary Like a Prayer in several U.S. cities and other European and Latin American cities, which focuses on five long-time Madonna fans, including Nabokova herself. Mad for Madonna (2015) is a film about her fan base.

In 1987, Argentine writer Enrique Medina created the novel Buscando a Madonna (English: Seeking Madonna), based in the life of a Madonna fan named "Lucy" who wants to be like her. Since 1993, Emilia Mazer has starred in the theaters adaptation throughout Argentina and Spain, having various functions in 2002, 2013 and 2018.

Fan clubs and websites

In Representing Gender in Cultures (2004), Elżbieta H. Oleksy and Joanna Rydzewska wrote that there is literally "hundreds of webpages and newsgroups devoted exclusively to Madonna". A fansite called Madonnalicious.com created in 2001, received the BT Digital Music Awards in 2004, for the People's Choice Award in the best music website/unofficial site category.

Some website received press coverage or citations. For example, in a 2009 article of El País, it was mentioned that DivinaMadonna.com garnered 20,000 unique hits daily. German designer Michael Michalsky once confessed be a reader of AllAboutMadonna.com. MadonnaTribe.com, an original bilingual Italian and English website created in 2003, was shortly after translated into French and Spanish due an increase of its international visitors according to Italian writer Francesco Falconi.

Clubs
Madonna official fan club is Icon. Madonna's fan site has been recognized in some ceremonies, including at the 2016 Webby Awards for the General Website Celebrity/Fan category, and a nomination at the 2000 My VH1 Music Awards.

She also has different fan clubs around the world. Some were supported by her then record label, Warner Bros. Records, like MadonnaChile, created in 2007, garnering the label of her "official" club in the country. In Spain, the official fan club is Divina Madonna founded in 1987 according to El País, and is the oldest fan club of an artist in Spain. According to Colombian website Shock, the club served as a reference for Madonna's fan clubs for both Spain and the Americas, as well for others artists fan clubs in the region. Lucky Star from Argentina, was mentioned by media outlets when she filmed Evita, and was subject of analysis by sociologist Mario Margulis.

Fan activities

In a multiple-decades period, a significant amount of Madonna's fan-related activities garnered press coverage. Hispanic scholars in Bitch She's Madonna (2018) felt the contests related to Madonna "[were] one more expression of the impact of the artist".

In 1993, a three-day TV special show AllAboutMadonna was broadcast in Los Angeles by Continental Cablevision along with Century Cable and in New York by Manhattan Cable Television, chronicling her "excesses" of the performer and her fans. Flashmobs have been documented by the media as well, including SF Station announcing two in the city of San Francisco in 2011.

Conventions and tribute shows

Some fan conventions received local, national or international media citations as well. The first international convention was the Madonnathon, organized in 1992. The inaugural edition received fans from 3 continents, including people from Australia, Canada, Portugal and Switzerland, and received the media attention of media outlets such as Billboard, People, MTV and the program Day One of ABC. The second edition, also known as Madonnathon '93 reached a higher attendance, as fans from Mexico and United Kingdom travelled to the States. Another convention, also called Madonnathon was created in 2003 to celebrate her birthday and other themed dates. According to BroadwayWorld in 2018, is "the largest Madonna tribute show and dance party in the world". 

Brisbane Madonna Party was established around 2006, and is Australia's longest-running Madonna party. Divina Madonna Party, organized by her Spaniard official club, is an annual event which takes place in different cities of Spain. In Brazil, Club A Lôca devoted an entire month Madonna-themed party from at least 2000 to 2007. Festonna, is a tribute show to the singer created in 2005 by DJ Rafael Augustto in Brazil. In 2019, they created a carnival block for the Carnival of São Paulo, named "A Madonna Está Aqui".

Around 2003 or 2004, it was established the annual party Madonnarama in the United States. Created by DJ Ed Bailey, he began with small parties in his Washington D.C. home base. In the following years, the gatherings upward of 3,000 people, and it was at some point regularly hosted in D.C., Houston, Atlanta and Philadelphia.  In 2007, Joey Guerra, music critic of Houston Chronicle described the events of Houston as "one of the year's most popular nightlife events, thanks to Madonna's enduring catalog".

Fan activism and charitably activities
Fan-led campaigns were also noted. For example, in 2006, 3,300 fans signed at petitionline.com the "End the Madonna U.S. Radio Boycott", because low chart performance in the U.S. of her singles during the release of Confessions on a Dance Floor, as well as conspiracy theories about why she was not played on radio. Bedtime Stories became the subject of a fan-led social media campaign amid the COVID-19 pandemic, promoted with hashtag #JusticeForBedtimeStories. The campaign resulted in the album reaching number one on the iTunes albums charts in several countries. She confirmed her delight a few hours later on Twitter, expressing gratitude to all the fans in isolation for making this feat happen. In January 1986, Terrence Ross, an anti-nuke activist and Madonna fan, created the Association to Save Madonna from Nuclear War (ASMNW), an effort to have portions of areas where singer lived or socialized declared as nuclear-free zones. She received coverage of national publications such as Saturday Review and Harper's to Nuclear Times among others. 

From the international convention Madonnathon (e. 1992), proceeds from admission of the two first editions went to AIDS charities, including Midwest AIDS Prevention Project. In 2013, fan clubs Madonna Celebrate and Madonnalicious host a sold-out benefit party in aid of St Stephen's AIDS Trust in London. In 2018, French fashion photographer Vincent Flouret, also a fan, recreated many Madonna's looks with his Golden retriever. The earnings of session called Maxdonna were destined to Madonna's charity Raising Malawi.

Memorabilia
Author Alina Simone found that there is a least one investment fund dedicated almost fully to Madonna: Marquee Capital, founded by Chetan Trivedi and whose valuation is almost entirely based on Madonna. Marquee Capital have contributed to numerous of Madonna exhibitions, including one in Macau. Reuters also reported they have participated in the biggest collection of Madonna items ever to come to auction at one time in partnership with Julien's Auctions in 2014.

Madonna's interaction

Madonna has interacted with her community in many ways; including final decisions that were incorporated in her works. An example of the latter occurred with her album Celebration as her songs on the compilation were selected by Madonna and her fans. An invitation to her fans to be part of her video "Celebration" was made through her official website.

Madonna has been also active on social media, interacting with fans and audience. In addition, her cut "Broken" from Celebration was given to Madonna's fanclub Icon's official members as a free 12" vinyl, as a part of their membership in late 2012. During the Rebel Heart Tour, the singer promoted fan artworks. Madonna: Tears of a Clown was given as a special concert to her Australian fans, due she dodged the country for way too long during her previous tours. Tickets were free, but made available to only members of her official fan club, Icon, and were non-transferable. In 2017, she discussed the idea of intimate shows and being able to talk directly to the audience. Her all-theater 2019 tour Madame X Tour, explored this idea.

In 2013, Madonna gave her fans the opportunity to ask her (almost) anything as part of a r/IAmA of Reddit. In 2015, Madonna chat with five selected fans on Grindr as part of the promotion of her album Rebel Heart. The same year, she had an interactive video chat with her fans as part of an AskAnythingChat for Romeo Saturday Night Online. In 2019, during the release of her album Madame X Madonna interacted again with her fans in the LiveXLive of iHeartRadio, and in the MTV interview "MTV Presents Madonna Live & Exclusive: 'Medellín' Video World Premiere".

Controversies and ambiguity

Madonna's relationship/interaction with her fans has sparked diverse commentaries. In positive views, Randal C. Hill in Spotlight on Rock Stars (1989), argues that "she hates to disappoint her fans". In similar remarks, Spanish music writer Joaquín Luqui felt she gives herself to the "maximum". 

Others recognize, that she has inspired a love/hate relationship. In the 2010s, she often disgusted some her fans in various of her tours for being late or cutting performances length. Madonna or her team, for example were sued with class actions, including by 3,000 attended of her Chilean gig of the MDNA Tour, and a fan from Miami for her Madame X Tour.

Her usage of social media channels such as Instagram and TikTok since mid 2010s, where Madonna also used them as a platform of leisure, often generated criticisms from her audience and media. Nancy Jo Sales echoed in an article published for The Guardian in 2023, that "stories about fan 'concern' over Madonna's 'bizarre' behavior have abounded [...]" forcing her to ask to retire. Nancy suspects and explored many things, including her nature as a self-marketing celebrity where she interprets the singer is aware of thing she does, also recalling a post on her TikTok account when a reporter in the 1990s, asked her "When Madonna is 50... 60, what will she be doing? "Who knows?", she replied, "Hopefully I'll be having fun".

Fans

Various personalities achieved fame in some contours for being known as Madonna's fans at some stage of their lives. "It's becoming increasingly common for Madonna fans to achieve mini-celebrity status themselves", expressed John Hand from BBC News in 2001. In 2015, Billboard tagged Matthew Rettenmund as a "Madonna expert". Some fan-Madonna impersonators such as Adam Guerra, known by his stage name Venus D-Lite, received media citations as well. He went viral after his appearance in My Strange Addiction (Addicted To Being Madonna from season 6) in 2015, and for having spent almost $200,000 to look like Madonna. He previously competed in RuPaul's Drag Race, season 3 in 2011.

Collectors

Various Madonna fan-collectors received coverage or featured in documentaries and TV specials of the subject. For example, Chris Gennaro was part of the 2004 VH1 special, Totally Obsessed. Eduardo Espinoza, founder of official Chilean club, MadonnaChile and also her collector, received coverage of leading national media such as La Tercera, El Mercurio or Radio Cooperativa and overseas through the 2000s and 2010s. According to EFE in 2006, Steven Christen of Switzerland was classified to have the largest European Madonna collection.

BBC's journalist John Hand also garnered press attention, called by Australian newspaper The Age in 2002 as a Madonna-phile. James Harknett from London, received media citations of publications such as BBC or The Independent. Part of his collection was used in the 2009 exhibition, Simply Madonna: Materials of the Girl, which according to The Daily Telegraph was the world's largest private Madonna collection. Danish collector Marek B. Poulsen, was featured in the first Gaffa dedicated section to music fan collectors in 2012.

Public figures identifying as fans

Over decades, numerous celebrities have declared been Madonna fans. Some were inspired by this feeling to run some projects; Mexican painter Alberto Gironella talked about his obsession on Madonna, and before pass away, he confessed that his latest works "spin around her". Spanish actress Claudia Molina accepted to perform the tribute show Remember. Live tribute to Madonna (2019) because she is a fan. Sonic Youth member Kim Gordon explored in one of the chapters of Goodbye 20th Century their admiration towards Madonna. According to author Tyler Conroy, they "refashioned itself as a Madonna tribute band" with the project "Ciccone Youth". 

According to Benyamin Cohen in 2019, some of "Israel's biggest stars are also Madonna fans" and he included Gal Gadot. Other public figures publicly declaring be fans include but are not limited to Britney Spears, Lady Gaga, and Taylor Swift. Despite their hermetic culture, some journalists like Mark Bowden have reported Kim Jong-un is fan of her music. Other attribution was with Andy Warhol made by National Geographic Society.

Stalkers and hackers

Madonna has had encounters with various obsessed fans. One of the first on record is Todd Lawrence aged 26, who stalked the singer in 1994, scaling an eight-foot security fence to get into her estate around. Lawrence claimed she was "his wife", and his intentions was to marry her or kill her.

During 1995 and 1996, Robert Dewey Hoskins, aged 37, scaled the wall outside the singer's Hollywood Hills estate several times. He was sentenced to 10 years in jail in 1996. In the court, Madonna identified Mr. Hoskins "as the man who came to her estate and threatened to slice her throat 'from ear to ear' if she did not become his wife". In 2012, Hoskins escaped from a psychiatric hospital. In 2012, professor of forensic psychology Katherine Ramsland discussed Madonna's case with Hoskins and concluded that "Madonna's obsessive fan reflects our celebrity-centered culture".

In 2010, Robert Linhart aged 59, a former firefighter was accused of stalking Madonna outside her apartment building in New York. Linhart was charged with graffiti and criminal possession of an ice pick, and also for resisting arrest. Madonna, however, told the press she was not scared of alleged stalker, despite he vowed to keep showing up at her door until meet her. His defense lawyer Cheryl Bader told Daily News there was "no threatening conduct"; and also said: "My understanding is it's not a crime to adore Madonna. If it were, the court would be a lot more crowded".

In 1993, The Houston Chronicle reported that David Koresh was obsessed with Madonna and sometimes wanted to kill her. In 2004, Madonna told the press was afraid of been murdered by a fan like John Lennon, reporting that an obsessed millionaire fan was stalking her. In 2008, a 16-years old Madonna fan, tried to kill her then husband, Guy Ritchie during the set of Sherlock Holmes. Reportedly wielding a knife and shouted: "I'm Madonna's biggest fan! I'm gonna kill Guy!". In 2011, Grzegorz Matlok of 30 from Poland, who gained entry into her London home was identified as a Madonna stalker, whom suffered "delusions that Madonna loved him".

In 2011, the "Madonnaleaks" case conducted to arrest a Spaniard Madonna fan, identified only with his initials J.M.R. (31 years-old) after illegally leaking the demo of her song "Give Me All Your Luvin'". In 2015, after an international investigation assisted by the FBI, Adi Lederman (39 years-old), an Israeli man and Madonna fan was jailed for 14 months in Tel Aviv for hacking her computer and leaking her album Rebel Heart.

Cultural analysis

The Madonna fandom attracted numerous analysis flourished in the emerging fan studies and also, the Madonna studies in late twentieth century. Professors Gail Dines and Jean M. Humez, cited that "the most visible and most scrutinized Madonna fans [were] the wannabe's adolescent white girls". One of the first to study Madonna and her fans is John Fiske, whom studies have been cited by various other academics over years. In the compendium The Madonna Connection (1993), it was written:

The earliest studiers focused about Madonna herself: her appearance, clothes, what she does and says, and what she represents for them. The main impact of these descriptions was found in her wannabes. A contemporary comment from 1985, says: "She appears to her fans as one of them, a young girl simply". Fiske seen Madonna offering "her fans access to semiotic and social power, which in turn, may empower the fan's sense of self and thus affect her behavior in social situations". Similarly, Graham Cray concurred that she provided a "vehicle for escape" for the majority of her fans, saying that "she erects a screen on which the public can project their own fantasies".

During this century, also proliferated the studies of video music and the audience reception theory; various analysis on Madonna fandom were conducted in this vein. In 1990, professors Jane Brown, Anne Barton White and Laurie Schulze, presented the videos of "Papa Don't Preach" and "Open Your Heart" in three different universities and used a newspaper poll to set college student responses toward Madonna. Students were classified in genders and races; as well to determine level in Madonna fandom: Madonna haters, fans and neutral viewers. Another student's reaction was conducted by Thomas K. Nakayama and Lisa N. Peñaloza in 1993; Canadian professor Karlene Faith argues that such studies "give indicators that Madonna's fans as much as her detractors, bring a multicity of interpretations to her work".

Online fandom
Frances Wasserlein is one of the first to devote studies on Madonna and her online fandom; those analysis were part of the book Madonna: Bawdy and Soul (1997) by Canadian professor Karlene Faith. Wasserlein concluded that in this case, "fan categorisations of relevance/irrelevance reproduce the information flow which characterises the commodification of Madonna-as-pop-icon". In her research, Wasserlein denoted:

Other researches cited Wasserlein while exploring Madonna online fandom. Is the case of Matthew Hills in Fan Cultures (2003). In Media and Memory (2011), Joanne Garde-Hansen of University of Warwick also explored Madonna's fandom online, and cited Hills' work as a "groundbreaking work". In her analysis Garde-Hansen concludes: "Madonna is not dead at all, far from it, and yet the archiving, commemoration and remembering of her has already begun" citing archives commemorating her works and contributions.

Criticisms

In her early career, Madonna achieved a lot of criticisms for her perceived corrupting influence on her fandom. Some argued that the furor aroused by Madonna or The Beatles devastates men and women equally, "sometimes enhanced by the Dionysiac use of intoxicating drugs". 

Her fan base of teenage girls were cited, by researchers with severe concerns for many reasons. For example, when she released "Papa Don't Preach", American journalist Vanessa Grigoriadis explained she attracted a lot of criticism about corrupting her little girls fans or "encouraging teenage pregnancy". Overall, Cornel Sandvoss from University of Surrey, explained this fan base was deemed by critics "as one of the most disempowered groups in society". Some critics called them "cultural doped", able to be manipulated at will and against their own interest by the moguls of the cultural industry. And such a manipulation "would be not only economic, but also ideological". 

Commentator Gil Troy also said she was accused of fostering a generation of "sluts", as her teenage girls fans "adopted" her messages. Biographer Adam Sexton also wrote that for her critics, there is no shortage of evidence to support this view: Madonna's videos exploit the sexuality of her face and body. Thus, all this would suggest that "she is teaching her young female fans to see themselves as men would see them; that is, she is hailing them as feminine subjects within patriarchy and as a such is an agent of patriarchal hegemony". An editor of compendium The Madonna Connection described that "little wonder that they often were positioned as a passive audience or that there was a moral panic about the effects that Madonna was having on them".

Anti-fanaticism 
Naturally, over her career various observers have explored a rejection from many, including LGTB community. Professor Faith also wrote she lost a lot of her older fans, feminist fans and credibility when her first book Sex (1990) came out. 

Madonna also garnered a substantial anti-base of fans, and anti-fan demonstrations have been circulated since she burst on the scene. Maureen Orth explained that in the 1990s, her haters "monitored" her every move". Books such as I Hate Madonna Handbook (1994), by a former fan, and also I Hate Madonna Jokebook (1993) were published, where she was understood as a worst representation of many things. 

In 2009, Priya Elan from The Guardian placed her at number 10 with Google searches of "I hate..." with 276,000 results in 2009. John Marrs of same publication talked about Madonna Blows Chunks created in 2003, then largest anti-Madonna website. As of 2009, the web received 70,000 hits and 300 members regularly add to its 30,000 anti-Madonna messages. Kim Knight, in an article titled The Madonna complex for The New Zealand Herald in 2016, also explored the anti-Madonna fan material.   Tyler Cowen, cites however, that public figures are "criticized by millions every day". On the other hand, Israeli writer Amos Oz once mentioned about "a universal" idolisation on Madonna.

Alternative views or responses
Historian and journalist Garry Wills commented in Certain Trumpets: The Nature of Leadership (2013): Madonna fans have not acted on the subversive values scholars find in their idol. Her audiences were notably well behaved, with little evidence of the alcohol and drug abuse found at other rock stars concerts. Professor Karen L. Anderson from Stonehill College gives also a sympathetic view in her book Sociology: A Critical Introduction (1995), saying that "there is another way to look at Madonna and her fans": If her fans actively choose to listen to and imitate her, "rather they see in Madonna meanings that connect to their own social experiences", adding that "she offers her fans a model not for submitting to powerlessness, but for struggling against it and for subverting it". In the 1990s, professor Karlene Faith, felt and stated "such press is good news for Madonna, whose fortunes and influence multiply each time she is declared a menace", further adding that "so many anti-fans can't resist paying attention to her is testimony to Madonna's charisma".

Impact

In 1990, Lisa Lewis wrote that Madonna "was one of the first women to attract the kind of devotion of young female fans normally associated with male rock stars". In 1993, scholars Peggy Phelan and Lynda Hart have concurred that "more than almost any other artist whose identity seems patently intelligible, she has provoked immense pleasure in her fans by courting their identities as a component of her own". Jonathan Borge from InStyle believes that "before stars could easily take to social media to instantly share a behind the scenes glimpse of their lives, Madonna pioneered an open relationship with her fans with her Truth or Dare documentary". In 2015, Adam Holz from Focus on the Family proposed that Madonna continues to have influence when it comes to shaping the worldview of her fans. 

In 2011, Patricia Coralis from Catholic University of Portugal analyzed her public image and fans, concluding that her fan reactions reaffirms Madonna as a significant personality in the context of Western society. Mary Cross wrote in Madonna: A Biography (2007) her "over-whelming success of her music, videos/DVDS, concert tours, and sales speaks volumes" about both her popularity and fan base.

In 2012, Lojas Renner helped to create with some of her Brazilian fans, the world biggest fan letter ever written, a one kilometre message put in line of Ipanema. According to Emily Mackay of BBC, the singer has "inspired some very serious collections". In 2008, Record Collector placed her at the top of their 100 Most Collectable Divas. She also inspired others related records

See also 
 Cultural impact of Madonna
 Madonna impersonator

References

Book sources

External links 
 Official website for Madonna

Fandom
Music fandom
Celebrity fandom